Vinícius Gonçalves Matheus (born 6 June 1994) is a Brazilian footballer who currently plays as a midfielder for Nova Iguaçu.

Career statistics

Club

Notes

References

External links

1994 births
Living people
Brazilian footballers
Brazilian expatriate footballers
Association football midfielders
Campeonato Brasileiro Série D players
J3 League  players
Nova Iguaçu Futebol Clube players
Goiânia Esporte Clube players
SC Sagamihara players
Brazilian expatriate sportspeople in Japan
Expatriate footballers in Japan
People from Nova Iguaçu
Sportspeople from Rio de Janeiro (state)